National Highway 127E, commonly called NH 127E is a national highway in  India. It is a spur road of National Highway 27.  NH-127E traverses the state of Assam in India.

Route 
Barama, Baska, Subankhata, Indo/Bhutan border near Chowki.

Junctions  

Terminal with National Highway 27 near Barama.

See also 
List of National Highways in India by highway number

List of National Highways in India by state

References

External links 

 NH 127E on OpenStreetMap

National highways in India
National Highways in Assam